Connie & Clyde – Hit Songs of the 30s is a studio album recorded by U. S. Entertainer Connie Francis.

Allegedly inspired by the success of Arthur Penn's 1967 motion picture Bonnie & Clyde, Connie Francis decided in March 1968 to record an album of songs from the depression era. The selection of songs was made after interviewing several people about the hit songs from that era.

The album's title is a word play on the outlaw duo Bonnie and Clyde, two of the most remembered personalities of the era. Robert Arthur, the musical director of The Ed Sullivan Show, provided the only new song, the opening track Connie & Clyde".

Francis followed this project with enthusiasm, and within an unusual short preparation time of less than two months after the initial idea, the album was recorded on May 6, 7, and 11, 1968. Arrangements were provided by Don Costa, the live orchestra during the sessions was conducted by Joe Mazzu.

Two recordings on this album are especially noteworthy: Button Up Your Overcoat and You Oughta Be in Pictures were treated with a special mixing technique. The first bars of each song feature a nostalgic fake gramophone sound before bursting into glorious 1968 state of the art stereo.

The mixing of all song was done immediately after the recording sessions in early May 1968, followed by the album's release at the end of the same month.

In Germany, the album was released in a slightly edited version: With Plenty Of Money And You was removed from the Golddiggers' Medley, so the recording starts immediately with We're In The Money. On the album cover, the song was renamed The Golddiggers' Song: We're In The Money''.

For the photos on the album's cover, Connie Francis and an unnamed production assistant of MGM Records dressed up in fashionable 1930s style and reenacted the famous photo of Bonnie Parker and Clyde Barrow posing with guns in front of a Ford Model B of 1932.

Track listing

Side A

Side B

References

Connie Francis albums
1968 albums
MGM Records albums
Covers albums
Albums arranged by Don Costa
Albums produced by Don Costa